Blastobasis helleri is a moth in the  family Blastobasidae. It is found on the Canary Islands.

The length of the forewings is about 6 mm. The forewings are white, with blackish-brown markings. The hindwings are shining grey.

References

Moths described in 1910
Blastobasis